Gültekin Kaan is a Turkish German musician and singer born and raised in Remscheid. He merges Western pop culture with elements of Turkish art and folk music. He performs with his own band under the name Gültekin Kaan & diVan.

Kaan's lyrics in Turkish tell stories based on Turkish history and fables. He puts special focus on visual appearance by taking role of a Turkish sultan with his court of grand viziers, pashas, emirs, belly dancers and bodyguards, dressed in Eastern robes.

Kaan released his first album in 2011 called 1001 Divan on We Play/Sony Music label in Turkey. The follow-up album was in 2012 and titled Sofra released internationally on Blue Flame/ Rough Trade label.

Band
Arnulf Ochs - guitar
Mario Bartone - bass
Dirk Leibenguth - drums
Mustafa Aydın - bağlama

Discography

Albums
2011: 1001 Divan
2012: Sofra

References

External links
Official website
YouTube

Turkish rock singers
World music musicians
Turkish songwriters
Anatolian rock musicians